Harald "Bluetooth" Gormsson (died c. 985/86) was a king of Denmark and Norway.

He was the son of King Gorm the Old and of Thyra Dannebod. Harald ruled as king of Denmark from c. 958 – c. 986. Harald introduced Christianity to Denmark and consolidated his rule over most of Jutland and Zealand. Harald's rule as king of Norway following the assassination of King Harald Greycloak of Norway was more tenuous, most likely lasting for no more than a few years in the 970s. Some sources say his son Sweyn Forkbeard forcibly deposed him from his Danish throne before his death.

Name 

Harald's name is written as runic haraltr : kunukʀ (ᚼᛅᚱᛅᛚᛏᚱ ᛬ ᚴᚢᚾᚢᚴᛦ) in the Jelling stone inscription. In normalized Old Norse, this would correspond to Haraldr konungr, i.e. "Harald king". The Latinized name as given in the medieval Danish chronicles is Haraldus Gormonis filius (Harald, Gorm's son).
The given name Haraldr (also Haralldr) is the equivalent of Old English Hereweald, Old High German Heriwald, from hari "army" and wald- "rule".
Harald's name is also inscribed on the so-called Curmsun disc, rediscovered in 2014 (but part of a Viking hoard previously discovered in 1841 in the crypt of the Groß-Weckow village church in Pomerania, close to the Viking Age stronghold of Jomsborg), as +ARALD CVRMSVN + REX AD TANER + SCON + JVMN + CIV ALDIN, i.e. "Harald Gormson, king of Danes, Scania, Jumne, [in] ".

The first documented appearance of Harald's nickname "Bluetooth" (as blatan; Old Norse *blátǫnn) is in the Chronicon Roskildense (written c. 1140), alongside the alternative nickname Clac Harald. Clac Harald appears to be a conflation of Harald Bluetooth with the legendary or semi-legendary Harald Klak, son of Halfdan. The byname is given as Blachtent and explicitly glossed as "bluish or black tooth" (dens lividus vel niger) in a chronicle of the late 12th century, Wilhelmi abbatis regum Danorum genealogia. The traditional explanation is that Harald must have had a conspicuous bad tooth that appeared "blue" (i.e. "black", as blár "blue" meant "blue-black", or "dark-coloured").
Another explanation, proposed by Scocozza (1997), is that he was called "blue thane" (or "dark thane") in England (with Anglo-Saxon thegn corrupted to tan when the name came back into Old Norse).

Reign

During his reign, Harald oversaw the reconstruction of the Jelling runic stones, and numerous other public works. The most famous is fortifying the fortress of Aros (nowadays Aarhus) which was situated in a central position in his kingdom in the year 979. Some believe these projects were a way for him to consolidate economic and military control of his country and the main city. Ring forts were built in five strategic locations with Aarhus perfectly in the middle: Trelleborg on Zealand, Borrering in eastern Zealand (the inner construction of this fort is still yet to be established), Nonnebakken on Funen, Fyrkat in Himmerland (northern Jutland) and Aggersborg near Limfjord. All five fortresses had similar designs: "perfectly circular with gates opening to the four corners of the earth, and a courtyard divided into four areas which held large houses set in a square pattern." A sixth Trelleborg of similar design, located at Borgeby, in Scania, has been dated to about 1000 and may have been built by King Harald and a second fort named Trelleborg is located near the modern town of Trelleborg in Scania in present-day Sweden, but is of older date and thus pre-dates the reign of Harald Bluetooth. 

While quiet prevailed throughout the interior, he turned his energies to foreign enterprises. He came to the help of Richard the Fearless of Normandy in 945 and 963, while his son conquered Samland, and after the assassination of King Harald Greycloak of Norway, managed to force the people of that country into temporary subjugation to himself.

The Norse sagas present Harald in a rather negative light. He was forced twice to submit to the renegade Swedish prince Styrbjörn the Strong of the Jomsvikings- first by giving Styrbjörn a fleet and his daughter Thyra, the second time by giving up himself as hostage, along with yet another fleet. When Styrbjörn brought this fleet to Uppsala to claim the throne of Sweden, Harald broke his oath and fled with his Danes to avoid facing the Swedish army at the Battle of Fýrisvellir.

In the wake of Otto I's death, Harald attacked Saxony in 973. Otto II counter-attacked Harald in 974, conquering Haithabu, Dannevirke and possibly large parts of Jutland. Harald regained some of the seized territory in 983 when Otto II was defeated by the Saracens.

As a consequence of Harald's army having lost to the Germans at the Danevirke in 974, he no longer had control of Norway, and Germans settled back into the border area between Scandinavia and Germany. They were driven out of Denmark in 983 by an alliance of Obodrite soldiers and troops loyal to Harald, but soon after, Harald was killed fighting off a rebellion led by his son Sweyn. He is believed to have died in 986, although several accounts claim 985 as his year of death. According to Adam of Bremen he died in Jumne/Jomsborg from his wounds. His body was brought back to the Trinity Church in Roskilde where he was buried.

The Curmsun Disc, found in Groß-Weckow, Pomerania, (after 1945 Wiejkowo) is inscribed with "ARALD CVRMSVN" (Harald Gormson), calling him, in abbreviated Latin, "king of Danes, Scania, Jomsborg, town of Aldinburg". Based on this, Swedish archaeologist Sven Rosborn has proposed that Harald is buried at the church there, close to Jomsborg, in what is now Poland.

From 1835 to 1977, it was wrongly believed that Harald ordered the death of the Haraldskær Woman, a bog body previously thought to be Gunnhild, Mother of Kings until radiocarbon dating proved otherwise.

The Hiddensee treasure, a large trove of gold objects, was found in 1873 on the German island of Hiddensee in the Baltic Sea. It is believed that these objects belonged to Harald's family.

Harald introduced the first nationwide coinage in Denmark.

Conversion to Christianity

King Harald Bluetooth's conversion to Christianity is a contested bit of history, not least because medieval writers such as Widukind of Corvey and Adam of Bremen give conflicting accounts of how it came about.

Widukind of Corvey, writing during the lives of King Harald and Otto I (ruled 962–973), claims that Harald was converted by a "cleric by the name of Poppa" who, when asked by Harald to prove his faith in Christ, carried a "great weight" of iron heated by a fire without being burned. According to 12th-century Danish historian Saxo Grammaticus in his work Gesta Danorum, Poppo performed his miracle for Harald's son Sweyn Forkbeard after Sweyn had second thoughts about his own baptism. Harald himself converted to Catholicism after a peace agreement with the Holy Roman Emperor (either Otto I or II).

Adam of Bremen, writing 100 years after King Harald's death in "History of the Archbishops of Hamburg-Bremen", finished in 1076, describes Harald being forcibly converted by Otto I, after a defeat in battle. However, Widukind does not mention such an event in his contemporary Res gestae saxonicae sive annalium libri tres or Deeds of the Saxons. Some 250 years after the event, the Heimskringla relates that Harald was converted with Earl Haakon, by Otto II (ruled 973 – 983).

A cleric named Poppa, perhaps the same one, also appears in Adam of Bremen's history, but in connection with Eric of Sweden, who had supposedly conquered Denmark (the fact that Eric conquered Denmark during the realm of Sweyn Forkbeard is explained by Saxo as a punishment of Sweyn's apostasy). The story of this otherwise unknown Poppo or Poppa's miracle and baptism of Harald is also depicted on the gilded altar piece in the Church of Tamdrup in Denmark (see image at top of this article). The altar itself dates to about 1200. Adam of Bremen's claim regarding Otto I and Harald appears to have been inspired by an attempt to manufacture a historical reason for the archbishops of Hamburg-Bremen to claim jurisdiction over Denmark (and thus the rest of Scandinavia); in the 1070s, the Danish king was in Rome asking for Denmark to have its own arch-bishop, and Adam's account of Harald's supposed conversion (and baptism of both him and his "little son" Sweyn, with Otto serving as Sweyn's godfather) is followed by the unambiguous claim that "At that time Denmark on this side of the sea, which is called Jutland by the inhabitants, was divided into three dioceses and subjected to the bishopric of Hamburg."

As noted above, Harald's father, Gorm the Old, had died in 958, and had been buried in a mound with many goods, after the pagan practice. The mound itself was from c. 500 BCE, but Harald had it built higher over his father's grave, and added a second mound to the south. Mound-building was a newly revived custom in the 10th century, perceivably as an "appeal to old traditions in the face of Christian customs spreading from Denmark's southern neighbors, the Germans".

After his conversion, around the 960s, Harald had his father's body reburied in the church next to the now empty mound.
He had the Jelling stones erected to honour his parents. The biography of Harald Bluetooth is summed up by this runic inscription from the Jelling stones:

Harald undoubtedly professed Christianity at that time and contributed to its growth, but with limited success in Denmark and Norway.

Marriages and children

Spouses:
 Gunhild
 Thora (Tova) the daughter of Mistivir in 970. She raised the Sønder Vissing Runestone after her mother.
 Gyrid Olafsdottir
Children:
Tyra of Denmark, married Styrbjörn the Strong.
Sweyn Forkbeard. Born about 960. Usually given as the son of Harald and Gunhild, though it is said in some of the older sagas that he was an illegitimate son.
Haakon. Born in 961(?).
Gunhilde. She married Pallig, Jarl and Ealdorman of Devonshire. It is thought that they both died in the St. Brice's Day massacre in November 1002.

Bluetooth technology

The Bluetooth wireless specification design was named after the king in 1997, based on an analogy that the technology would unite devices the way Harald Bluetooth united the tribes of Denmark into a single kingdom. The Bluetooth logo consists of a Younger Futhark bind rune for his initials, H (ᚼ) and B (ᛒ).

See also
Hagrold, a 10th-century Danish Viking in Normandy, mentioned as a Danish king, who became conflated with Harald Bluetooth in a later historical account. Gorm expelled his brother Harald from Denmark after what would have seemed to be a kind of civil war between the two brothers and their followers, who both claimed to be kings of Denmark. These events took place in the second half of the 930s and the first years of the 940s.

Footnotes

References

 This article incorporates text from the 1913 Catholic Encyclopedia'' article "Harold Bluetooth" by Pius Wittmann, a publication now in the public domain.

External links

 

 
980s deaths
10th-century Christians
10th-century kings of Denmark
10th-century Norwegian monarchs
Burials at Roskilde Cathedral
Christian monarchs
Converts to Christianity from pagan religions
Danish Christians
House of Knýtlinga
Viking rulers
Year of birth unknown
Year of death uncertain
10th-century Vikings